Achlya longipennis is a moth in the family Drepanidae. It was described by Inoue in 1972. It is found in Japan (Honshu, Hokkaido) and the Russian Far East. The habitat consists of various types of mixed and broad-leaved forests.

References

Moths described in 1972
Thyatirinae
Moths of Asia
Moths of Japan